Lidija Osterc (1928 - 2006) was a Slovene painter and illustrator, best known for her illustrations of children's books.

She won the Levstik Award for her illustrations in children's books three times, in 1964, 1966, 1969.

Selected Illustrated Works

 Strašni lovec Bumbum (Bumbum the Terrifying Hunter), written by Tone Pavček, 1969
 Očala tete Bajavaje (Aunt Bajavaja's Specs), written by Ela Peroci, 1969
 Sneguljčica (Snow White), written by Brothers Grimm, 1966
 Hišica iz kock (House of Building Blocks), written by Ela Peroci, 1964

References

Slovenian illustrators
Slovenian children's book illustrators
Slovenian women illustrators
1928 births
2006 deaths
Levstik Award laureates
University of Ljubljana alumni
Slovenian women artists
20th-century Slovenian painters
20th-century women artists